The Comunidade Intermunicipal das Beiras e Serra da Estrela is an administrative division in eastern Portugal. It was created in 2013. Since January 2015, Beiras e Serra da Estrela is also a NUTS3 subregion of Centro Region, that covers the same area as the intermunicipal community. The seat of the intermunicipal community is Guarda. Beiras e Serra da Estrela comprises parts of the former districts of Guarda and Castelo Branco.

Municipalities

The intermunicipal community of Beiras e Serra da Estrela {CIM} consists of 15 municipalities:

Cities
The following localities are cities (cidades): Covilhã, Fundão, Gouveia, Guarda [seat capital of the CIM], Mêda, Trancoso, Sabugal and Seia.

References

Intermunicipal communities of Portugal
Centro Region, Portugal